Kimi no Tame ni Tsuyoku Naritai (きみのためにつよくなりたい) is the fifth studio album by the Japanese rock band Sambomaster. The song "Kimi wo Mamotte, Kimi wo Aishite" was used as the nineteenth Bleach ending.

Track listing

I love you & I hate the world

Sambomaster albums
2010 albums